This is a list of towns in England.

Historically, towns were any settlement with a charter, including market towns and ancient boroughs. The process of incorporation was reformed in 1835 and many more places received borough charters, whilst others were lost. All existing boroughs were abolished on 1 April 1974 and borough status was reformed as a civic honour for local government districts. At the same time a limited number of former boroughs and other settlements became successor parishes, with the right to be known as a town and preserve their charter. Boroughs that did not become successor parishes formed unparished areas, but were able to preserve their charters without a corporate body by appointing charter trustees. Since 1 April 1974 any parish council in England has the right to resolve to call itself a town council and many communities have taken up this right, including areas that preserved continuity with charter trustees.  However, no successor parishes have exercised this right (e.g. Ilkley).

This list does not include cities in England.

Chartered towns and town councils
This list includes:
civil parishes with town councils;
unparished areas that had borough charters before 1 April 1974 (including areas with charter trustees); and
towns with ancient/market charters that did not later gain borough charters or town councils.

A

B

C

D

E

F

G

H

I

J

K

L

M

N

O

P

Q

R

S

T

U

V

W

Y

Designated new towns

See also
List of places in England
Mill towns in the United Kingdom
List of cities in the United Kingdom
List of post towns in the United Kingdom
List of United Kingdom locations
:Category:Towns in England by county
Urban district (Great Britain and Ireland), settlement areas in the pre-1974 reform governance structure which had town-equivalent populations to municipal boroughs which could include a market town.

Notes
1  Successor parish under the Local Government Act 1972
2  Rochester has held city status, but does not currently

References

 
Towns in England
England